Nidi Sohana (also spelled Needi Sohana) is a union council in the Kotli District, Azad Kashmir. It lies 19 km from Khoiratta and is a union council of the Khoi Ratta Tehsil on LA Kotli 5, situated at the LOC and at the end of the Kotli Tehsil. Before partition, Nidi Sohana was  part of the Rajori Tehsil in the Riyasi District. The Muthrani Post is in this union council and is the highest point in the Kotli District.

Schools
The union council has 10 primary schools, five middle schools for boys and one for girls, and two high schools for boys and one for girls.
Government Boys High School Rajdhani Sohana
Government Boys High School Nidi Sohana
Government Girls High School Nidi Sohana
Government Boys Middle School Behara Kotera 
Government Girls Middle School Behara Kotera 
Government Girls Middle School Rajdhani Sohana 
Government Boys Middle School Mitthi Dhara 
Government Girls Middle School Mitthi Dhara

Main villages
The main villages are Nidi, Sohana, Rajdhani, Mithi Dara, Haripur, Bala Dara, Zerein Dara, Chanaga Gai, and Bera Kothara.bhaiyl

Main tribes
Most of the inhabitants of this union council (75%) are from the Gujjar tribe. Others are from the Rajput, Saadat Syed, Butt, Bhatti, and Mughal tribes.

Khui Forest
The Khui Forest is located in the Nidi Sohana Union Council.

References

 Mindat.org

Union councils of Kotli District